is the theatrical superhero film adaptation of the Japanese 2002 Kamen Rider series, Kamen Rider Ryuki, directed by Ryuta Tasaki and written by Toshiki Inoue.

The film is produced by Ishimori Productions and Toei, the producers of all the previous television series and films of the Kamen Rider series. Following the tradition of all Heisei Kamen Rider movies, it is a double bill with the movie for 2002's Super Sentai series Ninpuu Sentai Hurricaneger, Ninpuu Sentai Hurricaneger: Shushuuto the Movie, both of which premiered on August 17, 2002. The film's title is translated into English as Masked Rider Ryuki The Movie: Episode Final.

Plot
This movie is an alternate ending to the series, taking place after the events of episode 46. With only six Riders remaining in the Rider War, Shirō Kanzaki feels that time is running short to save Yui's life. At that time, Yui shows Shinji Kido and Ren Akiyama her childhood drawings and explains the reasoning for the Mirror World monsters and Shiro's reason to start the Rider War.

Shinji bumps into Miho Kirishima after she cons another wealthy man and takes Shinji's wallet. He chases after her before learning she Kamen Rider Femme prior to them being forced into fighting Mirror World monsters, Shinji making a failed attempt to convince her that they have to fight each other. Eventually, all but one of the riders are gathered by Shiro for an out-all fight, Miho revealed to be seeking revenge on Takeshi Asakura who murdered her sister and to resurrect her. But during the fight, Kamen Rider Ouja overwhelms Femme and was about to finish her off with Genocider when the Contract Monster is destroyed by a black-colored version of Kamen Rider Ryuki. His Kamen Rider form regressed to a Blank State before Femme destroys his Advent deck keeping him alive in the Mirror World, Takeshi disintegrates while attempting to kill the woman. Later, having intended to continue fighting, Shuichi Kitaoka renounces being Kamen Rider Zolda and forfeits to use his remaining moments to date Reiko Momoi.

Having assumed Shinji saved her from Takashi, Miho treats him to dinner while expressing her gratitude to the confused Shinji. While in the bathroom, the mirror Shinji enters, and disguised as the real one, tries to throw Miho off the roof of a building. As she realizes that he is not Shinji, he reveals himself as Ryuga, and Miho transforms to Femme to fight him. Ren as Kamen Rider Knight and fighting another Mirror World monster, notices Ryuga and Femme fighting, mistaking Ryuga to be Shinji. Femme is mortally wounded, but saved by Shinji as Ryuki who then catches a glimpse of his own mirror doppelganger before Ryuga leaves. After leaving the Mirror World, Shinji and Miho share a final moment together, before Miho dies from her wounds.

Ren returns to Shinji, thinking Shinji has finally realized the meaning of the Rider War and demands the two of them fight, while Shinji rejects Ren bluntly and claims he never thought of that.

Shinji remembers that he had previously known Yui as a child, and had abandoned her. This made her create a doppelganger Shinji in the Mirror World, then revealed as the mysterious Kamen Rider Ryuga, a darker form of Ryuki. Shinji feels that it was his fault that resulted in the creation of a darker version of himself. Taking Shinji's guilt into account, Ryuga tricks Shinji into uniting both bodies so he can be a real human, taking over Shinji's body in the process.

This is seen by Ren, who transforms into Knight and battles Ryuga, the two of them fighting while Yui's life shortens further. After defeating Knight, Ryuga tries to strike the killing blow before Shinji within Ryuga struggles. The two beings separate and they fight each other. After a climactic battle, Ryuga is killed by his original counterpart via Ryuki's Final Vent.

Ren tells Shinji that he must win, and that Shinji agrees he will not let up and will fight Ren willingly. Before they fight, Shinji and Ren transform into their respective Survive Rider forms and face a horde of Hydragoon Mirror World monsters as the movie ends.

Characters

Cast 
Takamasa Suga as Shinji Kido, Mirror Shinji Kido
Satoshi Matsuda as Ren Akiyama
Ayano Sugiyama as Yui Kanzaki
Kenzaburo Kikuchi as Shiro Kanzaki
Ryohei as Shuichi Kitaoka
Tomohisa Yuge as Goro Yura
Takashi Hagino as Takeshi Asakura
Kanji Tsuda as Daisuke Okubo
Sayaka Kuon as Reiko Momoi
Hitomi Kurihara as Nanako Shimada
Kazue Tsunogae as Sanako Kanzaki
Natsuki Katō as Miho Kirishima
Eugene Nomura as Restaurant Customer (DC ver. only)
Yoji Sawamukai (Played as "沢向 要士") as Kazuo Mizuoka
Erena as Miho Kirishima's Older Sister
Yoshikazu Ebisu as Owner of Mansion
Bengaru as Taxi Driver
Toshiki Kashu as Restaurant Staff (cameo)
Rina Akiyama as Amusement Park Staff (cameo)
Yūsuke Tomoi as Takeshi Asakura's Victim (cameo)
Jun Kaname (cameo), Tōko Fujita (cameo), Jun Yamasaki (cameo) as Okonomiyaki Restaurant Customers
Akiyoshi Shibata (cameo) as Okonomiyaki Restaurant Staff
Hiroyuki Shibamoto, Shigenori Sōya, Yoshimasa Chida, Katsumi Shiono as Sheerghost/Raydragoon voice
Tsuyoshi Koyama as Visor Voice

Songs 
Theme song
 "Alive A life -Advent Mix-"
 Lyrics: Yuko Ebine
 Composition: Kohei Wada
 Arrangement: Takahiro Ando
 Artist: Rica Matsumoto

Reception
Kamen Rider Ryuki: Episode Final grossed $10,112,538 at the box office.

References

External links 
 Official website from Toei TV

2002 films
Ryuki
Battle royale
Films directed by Ryuta Tasaki